The 1919 South Carolina Gamecocks football team was an American football team that represented the University of South Carolina as a member of the Southern Intercollegiate Athletic Association during the 1919 college football season. Led by Dixon Foster in his second and final season as head coach, the team compiled an overall record of 1–7–1 with a mark of 0–4–1 in SIAA play.

Schedule

References

South Carolina
South Carolina Gamecocks football seasons
South Carolina Gamecocks football